Khursheed Jabeen (17 October 1979) is a Pakistani former cricketer who played as a slow left-arm orthodox bowler. She appeared in 2 Test matches and 30 One Day Internationals for Pakistan between 2000 and 2006. She played domestic cricket for Karachi.

References

External links

1979 births
Living people
Cricketers from Karachi
Pakistan women Test cricketers
Pakistan women One Day International cricketers
Karachi women cricketers